Ali Mohammad Moadab (born March 10, 1977 in Torbat Jam) is an Iranian poet. Nominated and winner of some Persian poetry awards, he has been considered one of the distinguished poets of post-Revolution Iranian poetry.

Biography
Ali Mohammad Moadab was born in the village of Taghi Abad, in Torbat Jam, a city in Khorasan Province, Iran. He is graduated in Theology from Imam Sadiq University.

Moaddab's debut work Love poetry by Noah's son, was a collection of Persian poetry. In 2013, he published Galaxy of Faces which has been shortlisted for the annual Iran's Book of the Year Awards.

Awards and nominations
 2013 – Iran's Book of the Year Awards (Nominated)

Bibliography

See also

 Qeysar Aminpour
 Hossein Monzavi

References

External links
 The Official Website

20th-century Iranian poets
1977 births
21st-century Iranian poets
Living people